In 2000 the Kansas City Wizards earned their first ever honor winning the MLS Supporters' Shield by finishing atop the regular season point total (57). The Wizards continued good play took them through the playoffs and into MLS Cup 2000 versus the Chicago Fire where they finished their season in a 1-0 victory earning the club the MLS Double. 2000 was the first season that MLS games could finish in a draw, but to do so tied matches had an additional ten-minute overtime.

Squad

Competitions

Major League Soccer

U.S. Open Cup

MLS Cup Playoffs

Squad statistics

Final Statistics

References

Sporting Kansas City seasons
Kansas City Wizards
Kansas City Wizards
MLS Cup champion seasons
2000